Shamsul Islam (or Samsul Islam), is an Arabic phrase meaning Sun of Islam. It may refer to

 Shamsul Islam Khan (died 2006), Bangladesh Nationalist Party politician and former minister of industries
 Shamsul Islam (politician) (1932–2018), Bangladesh Nationalist Party politician and a minister of information, food, commerce and land
 Samsul Islam (born 1957), Bangladesh Jamaat-e-Islami politician.
 Shamsul Islam, Bangladeshi cricketer
 Shamsul Islam Khan (born 1978), Pakistani professional squash player